Chillin Island is an unscripted series based on the radio show of the same name. It is hosted by Alec "Despot" Reinstein, Ashok "Dap" Kondabalu, and Aleksey "Lakutis" Weintraub.

See also
 List of HBO original programming

References

HBO original programming